Margo Hayes (born February 11, 1998) is an American professional rock climber from Boulder, Colorado. In 2016, she won both the Bouldering and Lead Climbing events at the World Youth Championships in Guangzhou (China).  In 2017, she became the first woman in history to climb a  graded route.

Early life
Originally a gymnast who trained at CATS Gymnastics in Boulder, Hayes began climbing at age 10. She joined Team ABC, a renowned youth climbing program in Boulder, where she was coached by Robyn Erbesfield-Raboutou.  Hayes' grandfather, Dr. James Morrissey, led the first successful climb of the Kangshung Face on Mt. Everest and her father spent time climbing in Yosemite Valley.

Climbing career

Competition climbing
As part of the US National Team, Hayes has competed in all three disciplines (lead climbing, speed climbing, and bouldering) of the International Federation of Sport Climbing competitions. In 2015, at the IFSC World Youth Championships in Arco, Italy Hayes won silver both in bouldering and lead, behind Janja Garnbret.

In 2016, at the IFSC World Youth Championships in Guangzhou (China), she competed in the Juniors category, winning both the bouldering and lead events, placing 15th in speed, and placing first in the overall standings. In the same year, Hayes won a Golden Piton award from Climbing Magazine for successfully climbing 14 routes graded 5.14.

Hayes was one of four women to earn a spot on the 2019 U.S. Overall National Team as a first step to qualifying for the 2020 Olympics climbing competition.

Rock climbing

On February 26, 2017, Hayes became the first-ever woman in history to climb a  graded route when she ascended La Rambla, in Siurana, Spain). On September 24, 2017, she also completed the third-ever female ascent of a  when she ascended Realization/Biographie, in Céüse, in France. In March 2019, Hayes completed her third , climbing Papichulo at Oliana, Spain, and thus completing the trilogy of the "benchmark" and most notable  graded routes.

Personal life
In 2016 she won a prize in a scholastic art show.

Rankings 
 2019 - USA Climbing Open Bouldering Championships - Bronze
 2018 - IFSC Climbing World Championships Female Boulder - 10th
 2017 - IFSC Youth World Championships Female Junior Combined - Bronze
 2017 - USA Climbing Sport & Speed Climbing Champions - Silver
 2017 - IFSC Pan American Youth Championships Female Junior Boulder - Gold
 2017 - IFSC Pan American Youth Championships Female Junior Lead - Silver
 2016 - USA Climbing Sport & Speed Climbing Champions - Gold
 2016 - IFSC Youth World Championships Female Junior Boulder - Gold
 2016 - IFSC Youth World Championships Female Junior Lead - Gold
 2015 - USA Climbing Sport & Speed Climbing Champions - Silver
 2015 - IFSC Youth World Championships Female Youth A Boulder - Silver
 2015 - IFSC Youth World Championships Female Youth A Lead - Silver

Notable ascents

Redpointed routes 

:

 Papichulo – Oliana (ESP) – March 24, 2019 – First female ascent. Hayes became the first female to complete the "9a+ trilogy" of La Rambla, Biographie and Papichulo.
 Realization/Biographie – Céüse (FRA) – September 24, 2017 – First female ascent of one of sport climbings most iconic routes.
 La Rambla – Siurana (ESP) – February 26, 2017 – First-ever female ascent in history of a consensus  climb.

:

 Bad Girls Club – Wicked Cave (Rifle Mountain Park. (USA) – August 2016 – First female ascent.

:

 The Crew – Rifle Mountain Park (Colorado, (USA) – June 2016.

Filmography
 Break on Through - 2017 film directed by Matty Hong, documenting Hayes' ascent of La Rambla and Biographie, featured on Reel Rock 12.

See also
 Notable first free ascents

References

External links

 
 
 

1998 births
Living people
American female climbers
Sportspeople from Boulder, Colorado
Competitors at the 2017 World Games
21st-century American women